The Lever Nunataks are a chain of nunataks that extend southeastward from Fulcrum and the head of Creagh Glacier in the Wilkniss Mountains of Victoria Land, Antarctica. The group was named by the New Zealand Geographic Board in 1994; the name is suggested by the position and linear arrangement of the group as of a "lever" away from the "fulcrum".

References

Nunataks of Victoria Land
Scott Coast